"There Goes the Neighborhood" is the debut single by Body Count. It is the twelfth track on the band's self-titled debut album. For the song's music video, the word "nigger" in the lyrics was replaced with the phrase "black boys".

Track listing

References

1992 debut singles
Body Count (band) songs
Protest songs
Songs against racism and xenophobia
1992 songs
Sire Records singles
Warner Records singles
Songs written by Ice-T